The King of Jerusalem was the supreme ruler of the Kingdom of Jerusalem, a Crusader state founded in Jerusalem by the Latin Catholic leaders of the First Crusade, when the city was conquered in 1099.

Godfrey of Bouillon, the first ruler of the Kingdom of Jerusalem, refused the title of king choosing instead the title , that is Advocate or Defender of the Church of the Holy Sepulchre. In 1100 Baldwin I, Godfrey's successor, was the first ruler crowned as king. The crusaders in Jerusalem were conquered in 1187, but their Kingdom of Jerusalem survived, moving the capital to Acre in 1191. Crusaders re-captured the city of Jerusalem in the Sixth Crusade, during 1229–1239 and 1241–1244.

The Kingdom of Jerusalem was finally dissolved with the fall of Acre and the end of the Crusades in the Holy Land in 1291.

Even after the Crusader States ceased to exist, the title of "King of Jerusalem" was claimed by a number of European noble houses descended from the kings of Cyprus or the kings of Naples, and is claimed by the current king of Spain.

Kings of Jerusalem (1099–1291)

The Kingdom of Jerusalem had its origins in the First Crusade, when proposals to govern the city as an ecclesiastical state were rejected. In 1099 Godfrey of Bouillon was elected as the first Latin ruler of Jerusalem and was inaugurated in the Church of the Nativity in Bethlehem. He took the title of prince and Advocatus Sancti Sepulchri, meaning Advocate of the Church of the Holy Sepulchre. This was probably in response to the opinion that only Christ could wear a crown in Jerusalem. Advocatus was a title with which Godfrey was already familiar as the term was much used in the lands where the Crusaders originated; it referred to a layman who protected and administered Church estates. The following year, Godfrey died. His brother Baldwin I was the first to use the title of king and the first to be crowned king in the Church of the Holy Sepulchre in Jerusalem itself.

The kingship of Jerusalem was partially elective and partially hereditary. During the height of the kingdom in the mid-12th century there was a royal family and a relatively clear line of succession. Nevertheless, the king was elected, or at least recognized, by the Haute Cour. Here the king was considered a primus inter pares (first among equals), and in his absence his duties were performed by his seneschal.

The purpose-built royal palace used from the 1160s onwards was located south of Jerusalem's citadel. The Kingdom of Jerusalem introduced French feudal structures to the Levant. The king personally held several fiefs incorporated into the royal domain, that varied from king to king. He was also responsible for leading the kingdom into battle, although this duty could be passed to a constable.

While several contemporary European states were moving towards centralized monarchies, the king of Jerusalem was continually losing power to the strongest of his barons. This was partially due to the young age of many of the kings, and the frequency of regents from the ranks of the nobles.

After the fall of Jerusalem in 1187, the capital of the kingdom was moved to Acre, where it remained until 1291, although coronations took place in Tyre.

In this period the kingship was often simply a nominal position, held by a European ruler who never actually lived in Acre. When young Conrad III was king and living in Southern Germany, his father's second cousin, Hugh of Brienne, claimed the regency of the Kingdom of Jerusalem and, indirectly, his place in the succession. The claim was made in 1264 as senior descendant and rightful heir of Alice of Champagne, second daughter of Queen Isabella I, Hugh being the son of their eldest daughter. But was passed over by the Haute Cour in favour of his cousin, Hugh of Antioch, the future Hugh III of Cyprus and Hugh I of Jerusalem.

After Conrad III's execution by Charles I of Sicily in 1268, the kingship was held by the Lusignan family, who were simultaneously kings of Cyprus. However, Charles I of Sicily purchased the rights of one of the heirs of the kingdom in 1277.

In that year, he sent Roger of Sanseverino to the East as his bailiff. Roger captured Acre and obtained a forced homage from the barons. Roger was recalled in 1282 due to the Sicilian Vespers and left Odo Poilechien in his place to rule.  His resources and authority was minimal, and he was ejected by Henry II of Cyprus when he arrived from Cyprus for his coronation as King of Jerusalem.

Acre was captured by the Mamluks in 1291, eliminating the crusader presence on the mainland.

House of Boulogne (1099–1118)

House of Rethel (1118–1153)

House of Anjou (1153–1205)

In 1127 Fulk V, Count of Anjou received an embassy from King Baldwin II of Jerusalem. Baldwin II had no male heirs but had already designated his daughter Melisende to succeed him. Baldwin II wanted to safeguard his daughter's inheritance by marrying her to a powerful lord. Fulk was a wealthy crusader and experienced military commander, and a widower. His experience in the field would prove invaluable in a frontier state always in the grip of war.

However, Fulk held out for better terms than mere consort of the Queen; he wanted to be king alongside Melisende. Baldwin II, reflecting on Fulk's fortune and military exploits, acquiesced. Fulk then resigned his titles to his son Geoffrey and sailed to become King of Jerusalem, where he married Melisende on 2 June 1129. Later Baldwin II bolstered Melisende's position in the kingdom by making her sole guardian of her son by Fulk, Baldwin III, born in 1130.

Fulk and Melisende became joint rulers of Jerusalem in 1131 with Baldwin II's death. From the start Fulk assumed sole control of the government, excluding Melisende altogether. He favored fellow countrymen from Anjou to the native nobility. The other crusader states to the north feared that Fulk would attempt to impose the suzerainty of Jerusalem over them, as Baldwin II had done; but as Fulk was far less powerful than his deceased father-in-law, the northern states rejected his authority.

In Jerusalem as well, Fulk was resented by the second generation of Jerusalem Christians who had grown up there since the First Crusade. These "natives" focused on Melisende's cousin, the popular Hugh II of Le Puiset, count of Jaffa, who was devotedly loyal to the Queen. Fulk saw Hugh as a rival, and in 1134, in order to expose Hugh, accused him of infidelity with Melisende. Hugh rebelled in protest and secured himself to Jaffa, allying himself with the Muslims of Ascalon. He was able to defeat the army set against him by Fulk, but this situation could not hold. The Patriarch interceded in the conflict, perhaps at the behest of Melisende. Fulk agreed to peace and Hugh was exiled from the kingdom for three years, a lenient sentence.

However, an assassination attempt was made against Hugh. Fulk, or his supporters, were commonly believed responsible, though direct proof never surfaced. The scandal was all that was needed for the queen's party to take over the government in what amounted to a palace coup. Author and historian Bernard Hamilton wrote that the Fulk's supporters "went in terror of their lives" in the palace. Contemporary author and historian William of Tyre wrote of Fulk "he never attempted to take the initiative, even in trivial matters, without (Melisende's) consent". The result was that Melisende held direct and unquestioned control over the government from 1136 onwards. Sometime before 1136 Fulk reconciled with his wife, and a second son, Amalric was born.

In 1143, while the king and queen were on holiday in Acre, Fulk was killed in a hunting accident. His horse stumbled, fell, and Fulk's skull was crushed by the saddle, "and his brains gushed forth from both ears and nostrils", as William of Tyre describes. He was carried back to Acre, where he lay unconscious for three days before he died. He was buried in the Church of the Holy Sepulchre in Jerusalem. Though their marriage started in conflict, Melisende mourned for him privately as well as publicly. Fulk was survived by his son Geoffrey of Anjou by his first wife, and Baldwin III and Amalric I by Melisende.

Baldwin III ascended the throne with his mother as co-ruler, in 1143. His early reign was laced with squabbles with his mother over the possession of Jerusalem, till 1153, when he took personal hold of the government. He died in 1163, without heirs, and the kingdom passed to his brother, Amalric I, although there was some opposition among the nobility to Amalric's wife Agnes; they were willing to accept the marriage in 1157 when Baldwin III was still capable of siring an heir, but now the Haute Cour refused to endorse Amalric as king unless his marriage to Agnes was annulled. The hostility to Agnes, it must be admitted, may be exaggerated by the chronicler William of Tyre, whom she prevented from becoming Latin Patriarch of Jerusalem decades later, as well as from William's continuators like Ernoul, who hints at a slight on her moral character: "car telle n'est que roine doie iestre di si haute cite comme de Jherusalem" ("there should not be such a queen for so holy a city as Jerusalem").

Nevertheless, consanguinity was enough for the opposition. Amalric agreed and ascended the throne without a wife, although Agnes continued to hold the title Countess of Jaffa and Ascalon and received a pension from that fief's income. The church ruled that Amalric, and Agnes' children were legitimate and preserved their place in the order of succession. Through her children Agnes would exert much influence in Jerusalem for almost 20 years. Almaric was succeeded by his son by Agnes, Baldwin IV.

Almaric's wives, Agnes of Courtenay, now married to Reginald of Sidon, and Maria Comnena, the dowager Queen, who had married Balian of Ibelin in 1177. His daughter by Agnes, Sibylla, was already of age, the mother of a son, and was clearly in a strong position to succeed her brother, but Maria's daughter Isabella had the support of her stepfather's family, the Ibelins.

In 1179, Baldwin began planning to marry Sibylla to Hugh III of Burgundy, but by spring 1180 this was still unresolved. Raymond III of Tripoli attempted a coup, and began to march on Jerusalem with Bohemund III, to force the king to marry his sister to a local candidate of his own choosing, probably Baldwin of Ibelin, Balian's older brother. To counter this, the king hastily arranged her marriage to Guy of Lusignan, younger brother of Amalric, the constable of the kingdom. A foreign match was essential to bring the possibility of external military aid to the kingdom. With the new French king Philip II a minor, Guy's status as a vassal of the King and Sibylla's first cousin Henry II of England – who owed the Pope a penitential pilgrimage – was useful.

By 1182, Baldwin IV, increasingly incapacitated by his leprosy, named Guy as bailli. Raymond contested this, but when Guy fell out of favour with Baldwin the following year, he was re-appointed bailli and was given possession of Beirut. Baldwin came to an agreement with Raymond and the Haute Cour to make Baldwin of Montferrat, Sibylla's son by her first marriage, his heir, before Sibylla and Guy. The child was crowned co-king as Baldwin V in 1183 in a ceremony presided by Raymond. It was agreed that, should the boy die during his minority, the regency would pass to "the most rightful heirs" until his kinsmen – the Kings of England and France and Frederick I, Holy Roman Emperor – and the Pope were able to adjudicate between the claims of Sibylla and Isabella. These "most rightful heirs" were not named.

Baldwin IV died in spring 1185, and was succeeded by his nephew. Raymond was bailli, but he had passed Baldwin V's personal guardianship to Joscelin III of Edessa, his maternal great-uncle, claiming that he did not wish to attract suspicion if the child, who does not seem to have been robust, were to die. Baldwin V died during the summer of 1186, at Acre. Neither side paid any heed to Baldwin IV's will.

After the funeral, Joscelin had Sibylla named as her brother's successor, although she had to agree to divorce Guy, just as her father had divorced her mother, with the guarantee that she would be allowed to choose a new consort. Once crowned, she immediately crowned Guy. Meanwhile, Raymond had gone to Nablus, home of Balian and Maria, and summoned all those nobles loyal to Princess Isabella and the Ibelins. Raymond wanted instead to have her and her husband Humphrey IV of Toron crowned. However, Humphrey, whose stepfather Raynald of Châtillon was an ally of Guy, deserted him and swore allegiance to Guy and Sibylla.

Houses of Aleramici and Brienne (1205–1228)

House of Hohenstaufen (1228–1268)

House of Lusignan (1268–1291)

Regents
The frequent absence or minority of monarchs required regents to be appointed many times throughout the Kingdom's existence.

Later claims 

Over the years, many European rulers claimed to be the rightful heirs to the kingdom.  None of these claimants, however, has actually ruled over any part of Outremer:
 Count Hugh of Brienne claimed the regency of the Kingdom of Jerusalem, and indirectly, his place in the succession in 1264 as senior heir of Alice of Jerusalem, second daughter of Queen Isabella I, and Hugh I of Cyprus.  Hugh, although the son of their eldest daughter, was passed over by the Haute Cour in favour of his cousin Hugh of Antioch, the future Hugh III of Cyprus and Hugh I of Jerusalem.  The Brienne claim to the Kingdom of Jerusalem continued, but the family had afterwards next to no part in affairs in Outremer.
 Frederick of Meissen, Landgrave of Thuringia, briefly used the title of King of Jerusalem (alongside the titles of King of Sicily and Duke of Swabia) after the death of Conradin in 1268, as grandson of Frederick II, who had crowned himself King of Jerusalem in his own right. This claim was never recognized in Outremer or elsewhere.
 After the end of the kingdom, Henry II of Cyprus continued to use the title of King of Jerusalem.  After his death the title was claimed by his successors, the kings of Cyprus.
 The title was also continuously used by the Angevin kings of Naples, whose founder, Charles I of Anjou, had in 1277 bought a claim to the throne from Mary of Antioch.  Thereafter, this claim to the Kingdom of Jerusalem was treated as a tributary of the crown of Naples, which often changed hands by testament or conquest rather than direct inheritance.  As Naples was a papal fief, the Popes often endorsed the title of King of Jerusalem as well as of Naples, and the history of these claims is that of the Neapolitan Kingdom. At the time of their dethronement, the Habsburg Emperors of Austria used the title King of Jerusalem, as did the Savoyard kings of Italy, and the title is among those claimed by Felipe VI of Spain.
 In 1948 King Abdullah I of Jordan was crowned king of Jerusalem by the Coptic bishop.

See also 
 List of queens of Jerusalem
 Family tree of Kingdom of Jerusalem monarchs
 Timeline of the Kingdom of Jerusalem

References

Bibliography

Further reading 
 Adam G. Beaver, A Holy Land for the Catholic Monarchy: Palestine in the Making of Modern Spain, 1469–1598

 
 
Jerusalem
Jerusalem